Nnamani is an Igbo surname. Notable people with the surname include:

 Chimaroke Nnamani (born 1960), Nigerian politician and doctor
 Emeka Nnamani (born 2001), Danish footballer
 Ken Nnamani (born 1948), Nigerian politician
 Ogonna Nnamani (born 1983), American volleyball player
 Samuel Nnamani (born 1995), Nigerian footballer

Igbo-language surnames